Hoofddorp is the main town of the municipality of Haarlemmermeer, in the province of North Holland, the Netherlands. In 2021, the population was 77,885. The town was founded in 1853, immediately after the Haarlemmermeer had been drained.

History 
After the draining of the Haarlemmermeer, two villages, Kruisdorp (Crossvillage) and Venneperdorp (Vennepervillage), were founded in the centre of the polder. In 1868 they were renamed to Hoofddorp and Nieuw-Vennep respectively. Hoofddorp became more prosperous than Nieuw-Vennep, and it rapidly became the most important place of the district.

Landmarks 
In the late nineteenth century Hoofddorp was included in the Defense Line of Amsterdam. A fort was built next to the main canal, two batteries were located in what are now the outskirts of Hoofddorp, and several casemates were built to the east of Hoofddorp. A large dike known as the Geniedijk (Engineers' dike) connected the fort at Hoofddorp to the batteries and the casemates, and ultimately to the fort at Vijfhuizen in the west and the fort at Aalsmeer in the east.

In 1856, the first windmill in the Haarlemmermeer was built in the centre of Hoofddorp by Dirk David van Dijk. It was called "De Eersteling" (The First). Due to increased building around the mill it eventually fell into disuse. In 1977 the mill was moved to another location near fort Hoofddorp. It has operated regularly from that time and is now open to the public.

Transport 
The town is served by Hoofddorp railway station. In the 2020 timetable there are 4 trains an hour to Leiden (weekdays), 4 trains an hour to Amsterdam Zuid railway station, 2 trains an hour to Zaandam, and 4 trains an hour to Amsterdam Centraal. Journey times to Amsterdam Centraal are 25 – 30 minutes.

On 3 August 1912, Hoofddorp was connected by rail to Leiden, Aalsmeer and Haarlem.

In 1981, Hoofddorp was connected by rail for the second time, this time to Leiden and Schiphol Airport as a part of the Schiphollijn. The Southern High-Speed Line, that opened in 2007, will use existing conventional track from Amsterdam Central Station to Hoofddorp, where it will branch off onto a dedicated track. The trains will not stop at Hoofddorp.

On 30 November 1992 the Hoofddorp train disaster took place near Hoofddorp, causing 5 deaths and 33 wounded.

Hoofddorp is connected by many bus lines to many cities and towns in the immediate surroundings. Most bus lines are operated by Connexxion. In 2002, Hoofddorp was connected to Haarlem, Schiphol Airport and Amsterdam Zuidoost by the high quality bus line Zuidtangent.  In 2009 came the Second line from Amsterdam Zuid railway station to Nieuw Vennep . The Zuidtangent will be expanded by adding a line to Uithoorn and Amsterdam IJburg.

The bus station at Spaarne Hospital in Hoofddorp is the world's biggest structure built entirely from synthetic materials: factory-cut polystyrene foam with a polyester skin. At this moment it has been painted in a sort of orange/gold color.

In January 2019, CEO of Amsterdam Airport Schiphol Dick Benschop announced that agreements had been reached to extend the Amsterdam Metro's North-South line to the airport and Hoofddorp.

Government and infrastructure 
The Netherlands Aviation Safety Board, during its existence, had its head office in Hoofddorp. The Dutch Transport Safety Board, the successor agency, was established on 1 July 1999 and the Netherlands Aviation Safety Board was merged into the agency at that time.

Private transport 
Hoofddorp is well connected to several of the main roads in the Netherlands. At , the A5 motorway branches off to Haarlem from the A4 motorway that leads to Amsterdam and The Hague.

Hoofddorp itself lies on the crossing of the two main secondary roads in Haarlemmermeer: the N201 from Hilversum to Zandvoort and the N520, that runs alongside the main canal of the Haarlemmermeer and dissects the polder from north to south. The suburb of Toolenburg is connected to an as yet to be developed industrial area by the bridge Lute, which was designed by architect Santiago Calatrava as part of a series of 3 bridges over the main canal along the N520. The secondary road N205 connects Nieuw Vennep to Haarlem and is part of the ring around Hoofddorp; the N201 also forms part of the ring.

Sports 
FIFPro, the association of professional football players, is located in Hoofddorp.

Notable residents 
 Fanny Blankers-Koen, four-time gold medallist at the 1948 Olympic Games in London.
 C. Joh. Kieviet, writer of children's literature.
 Tineke Netelenbos, former minister of Transport and Water Management in the second cabinet of Wim Kok.
 Marly van der Velden, actress from the soap GTST.
 Khalid Boulahrouz, former professional footballer.
 Fajah Lourens, actress from the former soap GTST.
 Rinus VeeKay, racing driver active in North America and also known as Rinus VeeKay.
 Rianne Van Rompaey, top model, was born in Hoofddorp.
 Lucas Cornelis van Scheppingen, DJ,Record Producer, born in Manila, Philippines, Raised in Hoofddorp owner of Mixmash Records.

References 
 Garritsen, A.M. Pyttersen's nederlandse almanak. , 1998.

Notes

External links 

 Hoofddorp polystyrene bus stop
 picture of the route and stations of the Zuidtangent.

Populated places established in 1853
Populated places in North Holland
Haarlemmermeer
1853 establishments in the Netherlands